Hvila vid denna källa (in modern Swedish "Vila ...", Rest by this spring) is a song by the Swedish poet and performer Carl Michael Bellman from his 1790 collection, Fredman's Epistles, where it is No. 82, the final Epistle. It is subtitled "Eller Oförmodade avsked, förkunnat vid Ulla Winblads frukost en sommarmorgon i det gröna. Pastoral dedicerad till Kgl. Sekreteraren Leopoldt" ("Or unexpected parting, proclaimed at Ulla Winblad's breakfast one summer morning in the countryside. Pastoral dedicated to the Royal Secretary Leopoldt").
It depicts the Rococo muse Ulla Winblad, as the narrator offers a "little breakfast" of "red wine with burnet, and a newly-shot snipe" in a pastoral setting in the Stockholm countryside.

The popular song, described as one of Sweden's best-loved, has been used in at least 16 Swedish films. Its melody appears to be one of the few, possibly the only one, composed by Bellman. In the song's last stanza, the dying Bellman, in words attributed to the dying Fredman, says farewell.

Context

Song

Melody and verse form 

The song is in  time, marked Andante. It has six verses, each consisting of 14 lines, the end of the last line being repeated after a Corno interlude. The verses have the rhyming pattern AAAB-CCCB-BABABB. The origin of the melody is disputed, and it may well have been one of the very few of Fredman's Epistles (perhaps the only one) composed by Bellman himself, apparently in 1790, making it one of the last to be written. Hildebrand argued that the melody was Bellman's; Olof Åhlström wrote that it must have been borrowed from an unknown source. Bellman set two other songs, "Skåden den lugna stranden" (See the calm shore) and "Hjertat det kännes klappa" (The heart is felt beating) to the same melody.

Lyrics

Reception and legacy

Carina Burman writes in her biography of Bellman that Fredman does finally say goodbye in this, the last Epistle, as the subtitle ("An unexpected departure...") makes clear, as does the final stanza:

Indeed, Burman notes, the Epistle represents Bellman's dying words as well as Fredman's, and perhaps Ulla Winblad's too; at least, she certainly dies in one sense, and perhaps in the other as well; Bellman knew that he was writing his last Epistles.
All the same, Burman remarks, the song is a bright counterpart to the farewell of Epistle 79, with Ulla's beauty, green grass and music instead of apocalypse.
The Epistle's pastoral tone and descriptions of food are to an extent anticipated, writes Burman, in Bellman's longest poem, Bacchi Tempel, which mentions exotic imports such as melon and Parmesan.

Lars Lönnroth, writing in Svenska Dagbladet, suggests that the "spring" in the Epistle was in fact not a stream in summer meadows but a fashionable spa, perhaps Djurgårsbrunn on what was in Bellman's time the edge of Stockholm.

Henrik Mickos, in the 2011 Bellman lecture, discussed what the "pimpinella" of the first verse might be, concluding that salad burnet (Sanguisorba minor) was quite likely, given it was known at the time as pimpinella, and was more common in Sweden then than in the 21st century. Mickos dismisses the possibility that it was aniseed (Pimpinella anisum), which was used to flavour brännvin but not as the song has it ("red wine and pimpinella") a wine-based punch.

Epistle 82 has appeared in at least 16 Swedish films from 1929 onwards. It is included in the 1894 Danish High School Songbook. It has been described as one of Sweden's best-loved songs.
It has been recorded by Fred Åkerström, as the title track of his third album of Bellman interpretations in 1977. An earlier performance by the noted Bellman interpreter Sven-Bertil Taube on his Fredmans Epistlar och Sånger, recorded 1959–1963, was re-released on an EMI-Svenska CD in 1983. The Epistle has been translated into English by Eva Toller.

Notes

References

Sources

 
 
 
 
  (contains the most popular Epistles and Songs, in Swedish, with sheet music)
  (with facsimiles of sheet music from first editions in 1790, 1791)

External links 

 Text of Epistle 82 at Bellman.net
 Analysis of Epistle 82 by Lars Huldén, Bellman Society 2011

1790 compositions
Swedish songs
Fredmans epistlar